WASP-58 is a binary star system comprising a G-type main-sequence star and a red dwarf about 955 light-years away. WASP-58 is slightly depleted in heavy elements, having 80% of the solar abundance of iron. WASP-58 is much older than the Sun at 12.80 billion years.

Lithium was detected in the stellar spectrum of WASP-58A, making the star anomalous for its advanced age.

A multiplicity survey in 2015 did detect a red dwarf stellar companion at a projected separation of 1.281″  to WASP-58A, and it was confirmed to be gravitationally bound in 2016.

Planetary system
In 2012 a transiting hot Jupiter planet b was detected on a tight, circular orbit around the primary star WASP-58A.

References

Lyra (constellation)
Solar analogs
G-type main-sequence stars
Binary stars
Planetary systems with one confirmed planet
Planetary transit variables
J18184825+4510192